In geometry, an octahedron (plural: octahedra, octahedrons) is a polyhedron with eight faces.  The term is most commonly used to refer to the regular octahedron, a Platonic solid composed of eight equilateral triangles, four of which meet at each vertex.

A regular octahedron is the dual polyhedron of a cube. It is a rectified tetrahedron. It is a square bipyramid in any of three orthogonal orientations. It is also a triangular antiprism in any of four orientations.

An octahedron is the three-dimensional case of the more general concept of a cross polytope.

A regular octahedron is a 3-ball in the Manhattan metric.

Regular octahedron

Dimensions
If the edge length of a regular octahedron is a, the radius of a circumscribed sphere (one that touches the octahedron at all vertices) is

and the radius of an inscribed sphere (tangent to each of the octahedron's faces) is

while the midradius, which touches the middle of each edge, is

Orthogonal projections
The octahedron has four special orthogonal projections, centered, on an edge, vertex, face, and normal to a face. The second and third correspond to the B2 and A2 Coxeter planes.

Spherical tiling
The octahedron can also be represented as a spherical tiling, and projected onto the plane via a stereographic projection. This projection is conformal, preserving angles but not areas or lengths. Straight lines on the sphere are projected as circular arcs on the plane.

Cartesian coordinates
An octahedron with edge length  can be placed with its center at the origin and its vertices on the coordinate axes; the Cartesian coordinates of the vertices are then
 ( ±1, 0, 0 );
 ( 0, ±1, 0 );
 ( 0, 0, ±1 ).

In an x–y–z Cartesian coordinate system, the octahedron with center coordinates (a, b, c) and radius r is the set of all points (x, y, z) such that

Area and volume
The surface area A and the volume V of a regular octahedron of edge length a are:

Thus the volume is four times that of a regular tetrahedron with the same edge length, while the surface area is twice (because we have 8 rather than 4 triangles).

If an octahedron has been stretched so that it obeys the equation

the formulas for the surface area and volume expand to become

Additionally the inertia tensor of the stretched octahedron is

These reduce to the equations for the regular octahedron when

Geometric relations
Using the standard nomenclature for Johnson solids, an octahedron would be called a square bipyramid.

Dual
The octahedron is the dual polyhedron of the cube.

If an octahedron of edge length  is inscribed in a cube, then the length of an edge of the cube .

Stellation

The interior of the compound of two dual tetrahedra is an octahedron, and this compound, called the stella octangula, is its first and only stellation. Correspondingly, a regular octahedron is the result of cutting off from a regular tetrahedron, four regular tetrahedra of half the linear size (i.e. rectifying the tetrahedron). The vertices of the octahedron lie at the midpoints of the edges of the tetrahedron, and in this sense it relates to the tetrahedron in the same way that the cuboctahedron and icosidodecahedron relate to the other Platonic solids.

Snub octahedron
One can also divide the edges of an octahedron in the ratio of the golden mean to define the vertices of an icosahedron. This is done by first placing vectors along the octahedron's edges such that each face is bounded by a cycle, then similarly partitioning each edge into the golden mean along the direction of its vector. There are five octahedra that define any given icosahedron in this fashion, and together they define a regular compound. An icosahedron produced this way is called a snub octahedron.

Tessellations
Octahedra and tetrahedra can be alternated to form a vertex, edge, and face-uniform tessellation of space. This and the regular tessellation of cubes are the only such uniform honeycombs in 3-dimensional space.

Characteristic orthoscheme
Like all regular convex polytopes, the octahedron can be dissected into an integral number of disjoint orthoschemes, all of the same shape characteristic of the polytope. A polytope's characteristic orthoscheme is a fundamental property because the polytope is generated by reflections in the facets of its orthoscheme. The orthoscheme occurs in two chiral forms which are mirror images of each other. The characteristic orthoscheme of a regular polyhedron is a quadrirectangular irregular tetrahedron.

The faces of the octahedron's characteristic tetrahedron lie in the octahedron's mirror planes of symmetry. The octahedron is unique among the Platonic solids in having an even number of faces meeting at each vertex. Consequently, it is the only member of that group to possess, among its mirror planes, some that do not pass through any of its faces. The octahedron's symmetry group is denoted B3. The octahedron and its dual polytope, the cube, have the same symmetry group but different characteristic tetrahedra. 

The characteristic tetrahedron of the regular octahedron can be found by a canonical dissection of the regular octahedron  which subdivides it into 48 of these characteristic orthoschemes  surrounding the octahedron's center. Three left-handed orthoschemes and three right-handed orthoschemes meet in each of the octahedron's eight faces, the six orthoschemes collectively forming a trirectangular tetrahedron: a triangular pyramid with the octahedron face as its equilateral base, and its cube-cornered apex at the center of the octahedron.

The orthoscheme has four dissimilar right triangle faces. The exterior face is a 90-60-30 triangle which is one-sixth of an octahedron face.

Topology
The octahedron is 4-connected, meaning that it takes the removal of four vertices to disconnect the remaining vertices. It is one of only four 4-connected simplicial well-covered polyhedra, meaning that all of the maximal independent sets of its vertices have the same size. The other three polyhedra with this property are the pentagonal dipyramid, the snub disphenoid, and an irregular polyhedron with 12 vertices and 20 triangular faces.

Nets
The regular octahedron has eleven arrangements of nets.

Faceting
The uniform tetrahemihexahedron is a tetrahedral symmetry faceting of the regular octahedron, sharing edge and vertex arrangement. It has four of the triangular faces, and 3 central squares.

Uniform colorings and symmetry
There are 3 uniform colorings of the octahedron, named by the triangular face colors going around each vertex: 1212, 1112, 1111.

The octahedron's symmetry group is Oh, of order 48, the three dimensional hyperoctahedral group.  This group's subgroups include D3d (order 12), the symmetry group of a triangular antiprism; D4h (order 16), the symmetry group of a square bipyramid; and Td (order 24), the symmetry group of a rectified tetrahedron. These symmetries can be emphasized by different colorings of the faces.

Irregular octahedra
The following polyhedra are combinatorially equivalent to the regular polyhedron. They all have six vertices, eight triangular faces, and twelve edges that correspond one-for-one with the features of a regular octahedron.
 Triangular antiprisms: Two faces are equilateral, lie on parallel planes, and have a common axis of symmetry. The other six triangles are isosceles.
 Tetragonal bipyramids, in which at least one of the equatorial quadrilaterals lies on a plane. The regular octahedron is a special case in which all three quadrilaterals are planar squares.
 Schönhardt polyhedron, a non-convex polyhedron that cannot be partitioned into tetrahedra without introducing new vertices.
 Bricard octahedron, a non-convex self-crossing flexible polyhedron

More generally, an octahedron can be any polyhedron with eight faces. The regular octahedron has 6 vertices and 12 edges, the minimum for an octahedron; irregular octahedra may have as many as 12 vertices and 18 edges.
There are 257 topologically distinct convex octahedra, excluding mirror images. More specifically there are 2, 11, 42, 74, 76, 38, 14 for octahedra with 6 to 12 vertices respectively. (Two polyhedra are "topologically distinct" if they have intrinsically different arrangements of faces and vertices, such that it is impossible to distort one into the other simply by changing the lengths of edges or the angles between edges or faces.)

Some better known irregular octahedra include the following:
 Hexagonal prism: Two faces are parallel regular hexagons; six squares link corresponding pairs of hexagon edges.
 Heptagonal pyramid: One face is a heptagon (usually regular), and the remaining seven faces are triangles (usually isosceles). It is not possible for all triangular faces to be equilateral.
 Truncated tetrahedron: The four faces from the tetrahedron are truncated to become regular hexagons, and there are four more equilateral triangle faces where each tetrahedron vertex was truncated.
 Tetragonal trapezohedron: The eight faces are congruent kites.
 Octagonal hosohedron: degenerate in Euclidean space, but can be realized spherically.

Octahedra in the physical world

Octahedra in nature

 Natural crystals of diamond, alum or fluorite are commonly octahedral, as the space-filling tetrahedral-octahedral honeycomb.
 The plates of kamacite alloy in octahedrite meteorites are arranged paralleling the eight faces of an octahedron.
 Many metal ions coordinate six ligands in an octahedral or distorted octahedral configuration.
 Widmanstätten patterns in nickel-iron crystals

Octahedra in art and culture

 Especially in roleplaying games, this solid is known as a "d8", one of the more common polyhedral dice.
 If each edge of an octahedron is replaced by a one-ohm resistor, the resistance between opposite vertices is  ohm, and that between adjacent vertices  ohm.
 Six musical notes can be arranged on the vertices of an octahedron in such a way that each edge represents a consonant dyad and each face represents a consonant triad; see hexany.

Tetrahedral octet truss
A space frame of alternating tetrahedra and half-octahedra derived from the Tetrahedral-octahedral honeycomb was invented by Buckminster Fuller in the 1950s. It is commonly regarded as the strongest building structure for resisting cantilever stresses.

Related polyhedra
A regular octahedron can be augmented into a tetrahedron by adding 4 tetrahedra on alternated faces. Adding tetrahedra to all 8 faces creates the stellated octahedron.

The octahedron is one of a family of uniform polyhedra related to the cube.

It is also one of the simplest examples of a hypersimplex, a polytope formed by certain intersections of a hypercube with a hyperplane.

The octahedron is topologically related as a part of sequence of regular polyhedra with Schläfli symbols {3,n}, continuing into the hyperbolic plane.

Tetratetrahedron
The regular octahedron can also be considered a rectified tetrahedron – and can be called a tetratetrahedron. This can be shown by a 2-color face model. With this coloring, the octahedron has tetrahedral symmetry.

Compare this truncation sequence between a tetrahedron and its dual:
 

The above shapes may also be realized as slices orthogonal to the long diagonal of a tesseract. If this diagonal is oriented vertically with a height of 1, then the first five slices above occur at heights r, and s, where r is any number in the range , and s is any number in the range .

The octahedron as a tetratetrahedron exists in a sequence of symmetries of quasiregular polyhedra and tilings with vertex configurations (3.n)2, progressing from tilings of the sphere to the Euclidean plane and into the hyperbolic plane. With orbifold notation symmetry of *n32 all of these tilings are Wythoff constructions within a fundamental domain of symmetry, with generator points at the right angle corner of the domain.

Trigonal antiprism
As a trigonal antiprism, the octahedron is related to the hexagonal dihedral symmetry family.

Square bipyramid

Other related polyhedra
Truncation of two opposite vertices results in a square bifrustum.

The octahedron can be generated as the case of a 3D superellipsoid with all exponent values set to 1.

See also
 Octahedral number
 Centered octahedral number
 Spinning octahedron
 Stella octangula
 Triakis octahedron
 Hexakis octahedron
 Truncated octahedron
 Octahedral molecular geometry
 Octahedral symmetry
 Octahedral graph
 Octahedral sphere

References

External links
 
 
 
 Editable printable net of an octahedron with interactive 3D view
 Paper model of the octahedron
 K.J.M. MacLean, A Geometric Analysis of the Five Platonic Solids and Other Semi-Regular Polyhedra
 The Uniform Polyhedra
 Virtual Reality Polyhedra – The Encyclopedia of Polyhedra
 Conway Notation for Polyhedra – Try: dP4

Deltahedra
Individual graphs
Platonic solids
Prismatoid polyhedra
Pyramids and bipyramids